Enes Uslu (born 1 January 1996) is a Turkish freestyle wrestler competing in the 74 kg division. He is a member of Bursa Büyükşehir Belediyesi S.K.

Career 
In 2016, he won the gold medal in the men's 66 kg event at the 2016 World Juniors Wrestling Championship held in Macon, France.

In 2018, he won the silver medal in the men's 70 kg event at the 2018 European U23 Wrestling Championship held in İstanbul, Turkey.

References

External links
 

1996 births
Living people
Turkish male sport wrestlers
21st-century Turkish people